Witt Orison Guise (September 18, 1908 – August 13, 1968), nicknamed Lefty Guise, was a professional baseball player.  He was a left-handed pitcher for one season (1940) with the Cincinnati Reds.  He appeared in two major league games.  In a twist of irony, he faced a 20 different batters in 34 plate appearances but he faced four future Hall of Famers including the first two batters.  The first batter to face Guise was Enos "Country" Slaughter and he struck him out which is the only strikeout that he had in his career.  The next batter he faced was future Hall of Famer Johnny "The Big Cat" Mize.  Later in the same game he faced future MVP Marty Marion.  In his last game, he faced Mel Ott as well as Carl Hubbell.  Guise got his only major league hit off Hubbell so he accomplished a lot in a very few opportunities.  He did not record a decision, with a 1.17 earned run average, and one strikeout in  innings pitched.

An alumnus of the University of Florida, he was born in Driggs, Arkansas and died in Little Rock, Arkansas at the age of 59.

See also 

 Florida Gators
 List of Florida Gators baseball players

External links 

1908 births
1968 deaths
Albany Senators players
Baseball players from Arkansas
Birmingham Barons players
Cincinnati Reds players
Columbia Reds players
Florida Gators baseball players
Hazleton Mountaineers players
Jersey City Skeeters players
Major League Baseball pitchers
Minor league baseball managers
Vicksburg Hill Billies players
Lenoir Reds players